126th meridian may refer to:

126th meridian east, a line of longitude east of the Greenwich Meridian
126th meridian west, a line of longitude west of the Greenwich Meridian